Poland competed at the 2008 Summer Paralympics in Beijing. The country's delegation included 91 athletes.

Natalia Partyka, who represented Poland in table tennis, also competed at the 2008 Summer Olympics. She was one of only two athletes competing at both the Beijing Paralympics and the Beijing Olympics, the other being South Africa's Natalie du Toit in swimming.

Medallists

Sports

Archery

Men

|-
|align=left|Tomasz Leżański
|rowspan=2 align=left|Men's individual recurve standing
|596
|14
|W 97-88
|L 102-108
|colspan=4|did not advance
|-
|align=left|Ryszard Olejnik
|550
|21
|L 89-102
|colspan=5|did not advance
|-
|align=left|Janusz Bułyk
|rowspan=2 align=left|Men's individual recurve W1/W2
|549
|28
|L 88-104
|colspan=5|did not advance
|-
|align=left|Piotr Sawicki
|593
|15
|W 104-89
|W 104-99
|L 98-102
|colspan=3|did not advance
|-
|align=left|Tomasz Leżański Ryszard Olejnik Piotr Sawicki
|align=left|Men's team
|1739
|6
|colspan=2 
|L 191-202
|colspan=3|did not advance
|}

Women

|-
|align=left|Alicja Bukańska
|rowspan=3 align=left|Women's individual recurve standing
|533
|17
|L 96-98
|colspan=5|did not advance
|-
|align=left|Małgorzata Olejnik
|541
|11
|Bye
|W 98-85
|W 101-88
|L 85-98
|L 101-105
|4
|-
|align=left|Wiesława Wolak
|513
|19
|L 79-82
|colspan=5|did not advance
|-
|align=left|Alicja Bukańska Małgorzata Olejnik Wiesława Wolak
|align=left|Women's team recurve
|1587
|5
|colspan=2 
|W 166-162
|L 178-194
|L 182-184
|4
|}

Athletics

Men's track

Men's field

Women's track

Women's field

Cycling

Men's road

Women's road

Equestrian

Powerlifting

Men

Women

Rowing

Shooting

Men

Women

Swimming

Men

Women

Table tennis

Men

Women

Wheelchair fencing

Men

Women

Wheelchair tennis

Men

Women

See also
Poland at the Paralympics
Poland at the 2008 Summer Olympics

References

External links
Beijing 2008 Paralympic Games Official Site
International Paralympic Committee

Nations at the 2008 Summer Paralympics
2008
Paralympics